Ashley Cooper defeated Mal Anderson 6–2, 3–6, 4–6, 10–8, 8–6 in the final to win the men's singles tennis title at the 1958 U.S. National Championships.

Seeds
The seeded players are listed below. Ashley Cooper is the champion; others show the round in which they were eliminated.

 Mal Anderson (finalist)
 Ashley Cooper (champion)
 Ham Richardson (fourth round)
 Neale Fraser (semifinals)
 Barry MacKay (second round)
 Alex Olmedo (quarterfinals)
 Kurt Nielsen (first round)
 Dick Savitt (quarterfinals)

Draw

Key
 Q = Qualifier
 WC = Wild card
 LL = Lucky loser
 r = Retired

Final eight

Earlier rounds

Section 1

Section 2

Section 3

Section 4

Section 5

Section 6

Section 7

Section 8

References

External links
 1958 U.S. National Championships on ITFtennis.com, the source for this draw
 Association of Tennis Professionals (ATP) – 1958 U.S. Championships Men's Singles draw

Men's Singles
U.S. National Championships (tennis) by year – Men's singles